Oleksandr Golovsko is a Ukrainian paralympic swimmer. He competed in the Swimming at the 2012 Summer Paralympics, winning the bronze medal in the men's 50 metre backstroke S1. Golovsko also competed at the 2016 Summer Paralympics, finishing in fifth place in the Men's 100m Backstroke S1.

References

External links 
Paralympic Games profile

Living people
Place of birth missing (living people)
Year of birth missing (living people)
Ukrainian male backstroke swimmers
Swimmers at the 2012 Summer Paralympics
Medalists at the 2012 Summer Paralympics
Swimmers at the 2016 Summer Paralympics
Paralympic medalists in swimming
Paralympic swimmers of Ukraine
Paralympic bronze medalists for Ukraine
21st-century Ukrainian people